Janice Kim is an American professional Go player, author, and business-owner.

Early life and education 
Kim was born in Illinois in 1969 and grew up in New Mexico. She earned a bachelor's degree from New York University.

Career 
As a teenager, she studied Go in Korea under Jeong Soo-hyon. She represented the U.S. in the first World Youth Go Championship in 1984, placing third. In 1986, she played for the U.S. again and won the event. In 1987, she became the first westerner to be accepted by the Korea Baduk Association as a pro. She remains one of only five western females ever to attain professional status (with Joanne Missingham, Svetlana Shikshina, Diana Koszegi and Mariya Zakharchenko).

In 1997, she created Samarkand, an online store for go-related items. Samarkand later became wholesale only. In 2003, she was promoted to a 3-Dan professional Go player, the first female westerner to do so. Kim is the author of the Getting Go articles that accompany installments of Hikaru No Go, a manga about a boy who releases the spirit of a famous Go player, in the American magazine Shonen Jump. She also writes occasionally for The American Go E-Journal.

Personal life 
Kim lived in New York City, Denver, and San Francisco Bay Area before settling in New Mexico with her family. She has since become a professional poker player.

Bibliography 
Learn to Play Go: A Master's Guide to the Ultimate Game
Learn to Play Go: Volume II: The Way of the Moving Horse
Learn to Play Go: Volume III: The Dragon Style
Learn to Play Go: Volume IV: Battle Strategies
Learn to Play Go: Volume V: The Palace of Memory

See also 

 American Go Association
 Go professional
 Go players

References

External links
 American Go Association

1969 births
Living people
American Go players
Go (game) writers
21st-century American women writers
American women non-fiction writers
21st-century American non-fiction writers